Song Min-kyu (born 12 September 1999) is a South Korean footballer who plays as a forward for Jeonbuk Hyundai Motors and the  South Korea national team.

International career
He made his debut for South Korea national football team on 9 June 2021 in a World Cup qualifier against Sri Lanka.

Career statistics

Club
As of 12 March 2023

International goals
Scores and results list South Korea's goal tally first.

Honours
Jeonbuk Hyundai Motors
 K League 1: 2021
 Korean FA Cup: 2022

Individual
 R League top assist provider: 2018
 K League Young Player of the Year: 2020

References

External links 

1999 births
Living people
Association football forwards
South Korean footballers
South Korea international footballers
Pohang Steelers players
K League 1 players
Footballers at the 2020 Summer Olympics
Olympic footballers of South Korea
2022 FIFA World Cup players